Ian Nelson may refer to:

 Ian Nelson (actor, born 1982), American actor
 Ian Nelson (musician) (1956–2006), English New Wave musician
 Ian Nelson (actor, born 1995), American actor
 Ian Nelson (footballer), Scottish footballer